Aniyatha Valakal is a 1980 Indian Malayalam film, directed by Balachandra Menon and produced by N. P. Abu. The film stars Sukumaran, M. G. Soman, Venu Nagavally and Sankaradi in the lead roles. The film has musical score by A. T. Ummer.

Cast
 
Sukumaran as Kumar/Ganesh
M. G. Soman 
Venu Nagavally 
Sankaradi
Jagathy Sreekumar 
Ambika 
Shobha 
Shubha
K. P. A. C. Azeez
T. R. Omana
Alleppey Ashraf
Sreelatha Namboothiri
Santhakumari

Soundtrack
The music was composed by A. T. Ummer.

References

External links
 view in youtube, aniyatha valakal(1979)''
 

1980 films
1980s Malayalam-language films
Films directed by Balachandra Menon